Anita Needs Me is a 1963 short film directed by George Kuchar about an overheated tale of lust, guilt and Mom (made as a response to the French New Wave)  and starring Maulis Pearson as Anita. It has a runtime of 16 minutes.

External links

References

1963 films
Films directed by George Kuchar
1960s avant-garde and experimental films
1960s American films